Fall City Airport  is a private airport community located just outside Fall City, Washington

External links

Airports in King County, Washington